is a visual artist and anime designer known for the mechanical design of the Macross TV series and a number of its continuations from Studio Nue, of which he is a founding member. He has also contributed to the mecha design of other series such as Mobile Suit Gundam SEED Destiny.

Mechanical Design
Kazutaka Miyatake has designed the spaceships of several famous anime series. His attention to detail and mechanical realism have made his designs still admired upon and used in anime series and related products after several years of their initial appearance in visual media. One of Miyatake's most famous designs is the SDF-1 Macross spacecraft. Other designs of note have been his "Comet Empire" alien spaceship designs for Space Battleship Yamato II and the Zentradi alien ships and mecha from Macross as well as the titular mecha from the Dunbine and Orguss TV series and the Gunbuster OVA.

Miyatake also created the Mobile Infantry Power Armor design for a Japanese edition of the Starship Troopers 1959 novel in the 1970s. This design has been featured in the DAICON III and IV Opening Animations from 1981 and 1983, as well as the Uchu no Senshi (Space Soldiers) OVA adaptation from 1988.

Personal
On May 22, 2021 a fire broke out at Miyatake's home. Both he and his wife, Tomoko Watanabe, were injured as a result and taken to hospital, where Watanabe died.

List of works
 Space Battleship Yamato (1974) - mechanical designer
 Farewell to Space Battleship Yamato (1978) - mechanical design
 Space Battleship Yamato II (1978-1979) - mechanical designer
 DAICON III and IV Opening Animations (1981/1983) - mechanical design (uncredited)
 The Super Dimension Fortress Macross (1982) - mechanical designer
 Crusher Joe (1983) - mechanical designer
 Super Dimension Century Orguss (1983) - mechanical designer
 Aura Battler Dunbine (1983-1984) - mechanical designer, theme song lyrics
 Macross: Do You Remember Love? (1984) - mechanical designer
 Dirty Pair: Project Eden (1986) - mechanical design
 The Super Dimension Fortress Macross: Flash Back 2012 (1987) - mechanical designer
 Starship Troopers/Space Soldiers (1988) - mechanical designer
 Gunbuster (1988-1989) - mechanical designer
 Macross II (1992) - original mechanical design
 Dirty Pair Flash (1994-1996) - mecha designer
 Macross Plus (1994) - original mechanical designer
 Macross 7 (1994-1995) - mechanical and creature designer
 Doraemon: Nobita Drifts in the Universe (1999) - mechanical design
 Angel Links (1999) - mechanical concept design
 RahXephon (2002) - artistic concept
 Mobile Suit Gundam SEED (2002-2003) - design cooperation
 Macross Zero (2002-2004) - production setting designer
 RahXephon: Pluralitas Concentio (2003) - set design
 Submarine 707R (2003) - mechanical design
 My-HiME (2004-2005) - creature design (Kagutsuchi and Orfan - S. Nue)
 Mobile Suit Gundam SEED Destiny (2004-2005) - design cooperation
 Genesis of Aquarion (2005) - design assistant (eps. 2-13)
 Eureka Seven (2005-2006) - conceptual design
 Glass Fleet (2006) - mechanical designer
 Flag (2006) - mechanical designer
 My-Otome Zwei (2006-2007) - design
 Kishin Taisen Gigantic Formula (2007) - mechanical design (Xuanwushan-III)
 My-Otome 0~S.ifr~ (2008) - creature design
 Macross Frontier (2008) - conceptual design
 Infinite Space (2009) - spaceship designer
 The Girl Who Leapt Through Space (2009) - design
 Super Robot Wars Original Generation: The Inspector (2010-2011) - mechanical design
 Space Battleship Yamato 2199 (2013) - conceptual design

References

External links
 

 Kazutaka Miyatake anime at Media Arts Database 
Kazutaka Miyatake entry at Gears Online

Sunrise (company) people
1949 births
Living people
Macross
Mechanical designers (mecha)
Science fiction artists
People from Yokosuka, Kanagawa